Alvania precipitata is a species of minute sea snail, a marine gastropod mollusc or micromollusk in the family Rissoidae.

Distribution

Description 
The maximum recorded shell length is 4 mm.

Habitat 
Minimum recorded depth is 55 m. Maximum recorded depth is 1225 m.

References

Rissoidae
Gastropods described in 1889